Chatterbox is a 1943 American comedy film directed by Joseph Santley and written by Frank Gill Jr. and George Carleton Brown. The film stars Joe E. Brown, Judy Canova, Rosemary Lane, John Hubbard, Gus Schilling and Chester Clute. The film was released on April 27, 1943, by Republic Pictures.

Plot

Cast    
Joe E. Brown as Rex Vane
Judy Canova as Judy Boggs
Rosemary Lane as Carol Forrest
John Hubbard as Sebastian Smart
Gus Schilling as Gillie
Chester Clute as Wilfred Peckinpaugh
Anne Jeffreys as Vivan Gale
Emmett Vogan as Roger Grant
George Byron as Joe
Billy Bletcher as Black Jake
The Mills Brothers as Quartet
Spade Cooley as Band Leader / Fiddle Player

References

External links
 

1943 films
1940s English-language films
American comedy films
1943 comedy films
Republic Pictures films
Films directed by Joseph Santley
American black-and-white films
Films scored by Paul Sawtell
1940s American films